Chris Marlon Ondong Mba (born 7 August 1993) is a French footballer who plays as a winger. He played in lower leagues of France, Belgium and England before playing professionally in Slovakia.

References

4. http://cafesportplus.com/lettonie-a-la-decouverte-de-cris-marlon-ondong-mba/

5.http://www.gabonews.com/fr/actus/football/article/coupe-de-lettonie-chris-ondong-mba-rate-de-peu-le

1993 births
Living people
French sportspeople of Gabonese descent
French footballers
Stade Poitevin FC players
R.F.C. Tournai players
Goole A.F.C. players
Matlock Town F.C. players
ŠKF Sereď players
FK Ventspils players
Slovak Super Liga players
Latvian Higher League players
Association football forwards
French expatriate footballers
Expatriate footballers in Belgium
French expatriate sportspeople in Belgium
Expatriate footballers in England
French expatriate sportspeople in England
Expatriate footballers in Slovakia
French expatriate sportspeople in Slovakia
Expatriate footballers in Latvia
French expatriate sportspeople in Latvia